WATZ (1450 AM, "WATZ AM 1450") was a radio station broadcasting a News-Talk format. The station was licensed to the city of Alpena, Michigan, serving the Alpena area. It first began broadcasting in 1946 and maintained the WATZ call sign since it signed on. The station was owned by Midwestern Broadcasting Company.

History
WATZ signed on the air in November, 1946 as a full-service local radio station and was, for many years, the only broadcaster in Alpena. In the late 1960s, WATZ-FM signed on as an adult contemporary station at 93.5 FM. By this time, the format of WATZ was primarily country. In 1988, the format of WATZ-FM was changed to country and the signal moved to 99.3 so the station could boost its power from 3,000 to 50,000 watts. For the next several years, WATZ-FM and WATZ simulcasted the same programming. In the mid-'90s, WATZ was broken off from WATZ-FM and given its news/talk format.

WATZ remained locally owned and operated by the same company that founded it in 1946.

On Tuesday, June 24, 2014 the engineers shut off the WATZ AM 1450 radio transmitter.

Midwestern Broadcasting surrendered WATZ's license to the Federal Communications Commission (FCC) on July 7, 2014; the FCC cancelled the license the same day. WATZ's format and programming were moved to Midwestern Broadcasting's newly licensed WZTK.

References

Michiguide.com - WATZ History

External links

ATZ (AM)
News and talk radio stations in the United States
Radio stations established in 1946
1946 establishments in Michigan
Defunct radio stations in the United States
Radio stations disestablished in 2014
2014 disestablishments in Michigan
ATZ